Jamestown is a British drama television series, written by Bill Gallagher and produced by Carnival Films, an NBC Universal International Television Production company, the makers of Downton Abbey. Set in 1619, Jamestown follows the first English settlers as they establish a community in the New World. Among those landing onshore are a group of women destined to be married to the men of Jamestown, including three spirited women. The series premiered on Sky One in the United Kingdom in May 2017. Sky ordered a second series of Jamestown in May 2017, before the premiere of the first series. Series 2 aired from February 2018. The renewal of Jamestown for a third and final season was announced by Sky One on 23 March 2018.

Summary
In 1619, twelve years after men founded the colony of Jamestown in 1607, women arrive from England duty bound to marry the men who have paid for their passage. Among the women are Jocelyn, Alice and Verity, who arrive with little idea of what the future holds or the disruption they are about to bring to the settlement. The new Governor, Sir George Yeardley, and his wife also arrive and discover that running the settlement is not without problems with a Company Secretary trying to undermine his position.

Cast and characters
Naomi Battrick as Jocelyn Woodbryg – Betrothed and married to Samuel Castell
Sophie Rundle as Alice Kett – Farm girl betrothed to Henry Sharrow but married to his brother Silas
Niamh Walsh as Verity Bridges – Betrothed and unofficially married to Meredith Rutter
Max Beesley as Henry Sharrow – Eldest brother of the three Sharrows
Gwilym Lee as Samuel Castell – Recorder to the Virginia Company of London in Jamestown (Series 1)
Jason Flemyng as Sir George Yeardley – Virginia Company of London Lieutenant-Governor and later Governor
Claire Cox as Temperance Flowerdew, Lady Yeardley – Wife of Sir George Yeardley
Dean Lennox Kelly as Meredith Rutter – Owner of the tavern of Jamestown
Shaun Dooley as Reverend Michaelmas Whitaker (Series 1)
Stuart Martin as Silas Sharrow – Middle brother of the three Sharrows
Steven Waddington as Thomas Redwick – Marshal of Jamestown
Matt Stokoe as James Read – Blacksmith/swordsmith/farrier/forger/craftsman
Burn Gorman as Nicholas Farlow – Secretary of the Virginia Company of London in Jamestown
Luke Roskell as Pepper Sharrow – Youngest of the three Sharrow brothers
Ben Starr as Dr Christopher Priestley – Physician/surgeon/apothecary
Tony Pitts as Edgar Massinger – Land owner and tobacco grower (Series 1–2)
Patsy Ferran as Mercy Myrtle – Servant girl of Samuel Castell and maid to Jocelyn Woodbryg
Kalani Queypo as Chacrow – Native Indian go-between the settlers and Pamunkey Indians
Raoul Trujillo as Opechancanough – Chief or King of the Pamunkey Tribe
Abubakar Salim as Pedro – Kingdom of Kongo Angolan warrior who is captured and sold into chattel slavery by the Portuguese but captive by the English (Series 2–3)
Abiola Ogunbiyi as Maria – Kingdom of Kongo Angolan married with children who is captured and sold into chattel slavery by the Portuguese but captive by the English (Series 2–3)
Rachel Colwell as Winganuske – Chacrow's sister married to Henry Sharrow as a gift (Series 2–3)
Ben Batt as Willmus Crabtree – A mysterious trader from England with his motives and intentions unknown (Series 3)
Harry Grasby as Tamlin Appleday – One of the boys sent from England by the company to work the fields (Series 3)

Production 
Most of the series was filmed in Vértesacsa, Hungary.

Episodes

Series 1 (2017)

Series 2 (2018)

Series 3 (2019)

Reviews
The Guardian said the show was an expensive soap opera, but found the show to be fun. A critic with the Financial Times questioned the accuracy of the show, especially its portrait of women. The Irish Times found that everything in the show is "absurd, generic or risible". The Telegraph was kinder to the show, as it found the show to be a "silly but gripping period drama".

References

External links

Meet the cast (Radio Times)

2017 British television series debuts
2019 British television series endings
2010s British drama television series
Sky UK original programming
English-language television shows
Television series set in the 17th century
Television series about the history of the United States
Television shows set in North America
Television shows filmed in Hungary